Liga e Dytë is the third level of football in Kosovo. It consists of 16 teams that play each other twice (home and away) during the season. At the end of the season, the top two teams in the division are promoted to the First Football League of Kosovo.

Clubs (2022–23)

Notes

References

3
Kos